The 2021 Southern Conference men's soccer tournament was the postseason men's soccer tournament for the Southern Conference held from November 1 through November 14, 2021. The tournament was held at campus sites, with the higher seed hosting. The seven-team single-elimination tournament consisted of four rounds based on seeding from regular season conference play. The UNC Greensboro Spartans were the defending champions but were unable to defend their crown, losing 2–1 in the Semifinals to the Belmont Bruins. The Mercer Bears were the tournament champions, defeating Belmont 4–3 in the final. This was the fourth Southern Conference tournament title for the Mercer men's soccer program, all four of which have come under coach Brad Ruzzo. As tournament champions, Mercer earned the Southern Conference's automatic berth into the 2021 NCAA Division I men's soccer tournament.

Seeding 

All seven Southern Conference men's soccer programs qualified for the 2021 Tournament. Teams were seeded based on their regular season records. Tiebreakers were used to determine the seedings of teams who finished with identical conference records.  Tiebreakers were required to determine the third and fourth seeds as Belmont and Furman finished with identical 4–2–0 records.  Furman earned the third seed by virtue of defeating Belmont during the regular season 2–1.

Bracket

Source:

Schedule

First Round

Quarterfinals

Semifinals

Final

Statistics

Goalscorers

All-Tournament team

Source:

MVP in bold

References 

2021 Southern Conference men's soccer season
Southern Conference Men's Soccer Tournament